Entire may refer to:
 Entire function, a function that is holomorphic on the whole complex plane
 Entire (animal), an indication that an animal is not neutered
 Entire (botany), a term in botany